The  is a permanent Japanese Antarctic unmanned observation base. It is located on Queen Maud Land and was opened in 1985.

See also
 List of Antarctic research stations
 List of Antarctic field camps

References

Japanese Antarctic Program
Princess Ragnhild Coast
Outposts of Queen Maud Land
1985 establishments in Antarctica